The 2002 Intercontinental Handball Cup was the 3rd edition and was hosted for the first time in Russia from 25 to 29 June 2002.

Qualification

Qualified teams

Table

Games 

''All times are local (UTC+3)

All-star Team 

Source:

References

External links
Official website

2002
International handball competitions hosted by Russia
Sports competitions in Moscow
Intercontinental Handball Cup
Handball
Intercontinental Handball Cup